Caulobacterales is an order of gram-negative pseudomonadota within the alpha subgroup.

References

Alphaproteobacteria
Caulobacterales